Watertown Airport may refer to:

 Watertown International Airport in Watertown, New York, United States (FAA: ART)
 Watertown Regional Airport (formerly Watertown Municipal) in Watertown, South Dakota, United States (FAA: ATY)
 Watertown Municipal Airport (Wisconsin) in Watertown, Wisconsin, United States (FAA: RYV)